Adamalysin (Crotalus adamanteus metalloendopeptidase, proteinase I and II, Crotalus adamanteus venom proteinase II, adamalysin II) is an enzyme. This enzyme catalyses the following chemical reaction

 Cleavage of Phe1-Val, His5-Leu, His10-Leu, Ala14-Leu, Leu15-Tyr, and Tyr16-Leu of insulin B chain

This enzyme is present in the venom of the eastern diamondback rattlesnake (Crotalus adamanteus).

See also 
 A disintegrin and metalloproteinase

References

External links 
 

EC 3.4.24